Muhanga is a city in Rwanda. Muhanga may also refer to
A.S. Muhanga, an association football club based in Muhanga, Rwanda
Muhanga District in Rwanda
Commune of Muhanga in northern Burundi
Kayanja Muhanga (born 1965), Ugandan military officer
Muhanga, Rukiga, a town in Rukiga District, Western Region, Uganda